Pultenaea calycina is a species of flowering plant in the family Fabaceae and is endemic to near-coastal areas in the south of Western Australia. It is an erect, spindly shrub with flat or more or less cylindrical, grooved leaves and yellow and orange flowers.

Description
The leaves are hairy and have stipules at their base. Flowering occurs from August to October and the fruit is an oval pod.

Taxonomy and naming
This species was first formally described in 1853 by Nikolai Turczaninow in the Bulletin de la Société Impériale des Naturalistes de Moscou and given the name Euchilus calycinus, from specimens collected by James Drummond. In 1864, George Bentham changed the name to Pultenaea calycina in Flora Australiensis. The specific epithet (calycina) means "calyx", referring to the unusual sepals.

In 2005, L.A. Orthia and Jennifer Anne Chappill described two subspecies and the names are accepted by the Australian Plant Census:
 Pultenaea calycina (Turcz.) Benth. subsp. calycina that has more or less cylindrical, grooved leaves;
 Pultenaea calycina subsp. proxena (Turcz.) Benth. that has cylindrical leaves.

Distribution
Subspecies calycina occurs from near Bremer Bay to the Stirling Range National Park in the Esperance Plains biogeographic region and subspecies proxena from near Ravensthorpe to west of Esperance in the Esperance Plains and Mallee biogeographic regions.

Conservation status
Pultenaea calycina subsp. calcycina is classified as "Priority Three" by the Government of Western Australia Department of Parks and Wildlife, meaning that it is poorly known and known from only a few locations but is not under imminent threat and subspecies proxena is classified as "Priority Four", meaning that is rare or near threatened.

References

calycina
Eudicots of Western Australia
Taxa named by Nikolai Turczaninow
Plants described in 1853